Chanyalew Haile (born 20 November 1949) is an Ethiopian boxer. He competed in the men's light flyweight event at the 1972 Summer Olympics.

References

1949 births
Living people
Ethiopian male boxers
Olympic boxers of Ethiopia
Boxers at the 1972 Summer Olympics
Place of birth missing (living people)
Light-flyweight boxers